The Ladbrokes Summer Stayers Classic is a greyhound racing competition held annually at Monmore Green Stadium.

It was inaugurated in 2002.

Past winners

Venues & Distances 
2003–2003      (Monmore 684m)
2002–present 	(Monmore 630m)

Sponsors
2002–present Ladbrokes

References

Greyhound racing competitions in the United Kingdom
Sport in Wolverhampton
Recurring sporting events established in 2002